The North East Lanarkshire by-election was a Parliamentary by-election held on 10 August 1904. The constituency returned one Member of Parliament (MP) to the House of Commons of the United Kingdom, elected by the first past the post voting system.

Vacancy
Sir William Henry Rattigan had been Liberal Unionist MP for the seat of North East Lanarkshire since the 1901 North East Lanarkshire by-election. He died on 4 July 1904 at the age of 62.

Electoral history
The seat had been Liberal Unionist since they gained it in 1901;

Candidates
The Conservatives selected 43-year-old George Touche to defend the seat. In 1883 he was admitted to the Society of Accountants in Edinburgh. In 1889 he was appointed first secretary of the Industrial and General Trust, later becoming manager, director in 1898. In 1899 he founded his own practice, George A. Touch & Co.
The local Liberal Association selected 60-year-old Alexander Findlay as their candidate.
Thirty-seven-year-old John Robertson stood as candidate for the Scottish Workers' Representation Committee. He was Chairman of the Scottish Miners' Union.

Campaign
Polling Day was fixed for 10 August 1904.

Result
The Liberals gained the seat from the Conservatives;

Aftermath
At the following General Election the result was;

References

Lanarkshire
North East Lanarkshire by-election
1900s elections in Scotland
North East Lanarkshire by-election
North East Lanarkshire by-election
Lanarkshire, North East